North Arm is a settlement on East Falkland.

North Arm may also refer to:

 North Arm, New South Wales
 North Arm, Queensland, a town and locality in Australia
 North Arm and North Arm Creek, in Barker Inlet, South Australia
 North Arm Bridge, an extradosed bridge in Vancouver, British Columbia, Canada
 North Arm Cove, New South Wales

See also
 North Bentinck Arm
 North West Arm
 Northern Arm